Salim Saifullah Khan (Urdu: سلیم سیف اللہ خان) is a Pakistani politician and President of a faction of the Pakistan Muslim League and a  Senator of Pakistan and Chairman of Pakistan's Senate Foreign Relations, Kashmir Affairs and Gilgit Baltistan Committee.

Early life 
Salim Saifullah Khan was born into an affluent family of Lakki Marwat, Khyber Pakhtunkhwa, Pakistan.

He is a Khan, or Lord of the Marwat tribe. He has, in the past, remained Finance Minister, Industries, Khyber-Pakhtunkhwa. He was also deputy opposition leader in Khyber-Pakhtunkhwa Provincial assembly in 1993. Salim Saifullah Khan has held portfolios of Housing, Commerce, Petroleum and Inter-Provincial Coordination as a Federal Minister. He has most recently served as the Chairman of Senate's Foreign Relation Committee. Presently Salim Saifullah Khan is Honorary Consul General of Turkey, at Peshawar.
 
He was elected President, Pakistan Tennis Federation on 12 December 2014.

Khan is a graduate of Carnegie Mellon University of Pittsburgh, Pennsylvania, USA. He is a Khan, or Chief of the Marwat Pashtun tribe.
He is the younger brother of Anwar Saifullah Khan, former Federal Minister Petroleum, and Humayun Saifullah Khan Nishan-e-Imtiaz Former Member National Assembly, His mother Begum Kulsum Saifullah Khan, Hilal-e-Imtiaz Pakistan was also a member of the National Assembly of Pakistan and a former Federal Minister.

Representations abroad 
2004: Member Pakistan delegation to UNGA.
2004 Head of Pakistan Delegation to Afghanistan.
October, 2003 Head of Pakistan Delegation, Bangladesh.
June, 2003 Head of Pakistan Delegation, UMNO conference, Kuala Lumpur, Malaysia.
Member of Parliamentary Delegation to Australia
1991. Leader of Pakistan Delegation to I.L.O. Geneva
1986 - Headed an official Pakistani delegation to Japan.
1978- Member of Official Delegation to Japan and Hong Kong,
1975- Member of Textile Delegation to China and Far East.
1974- Pakistan Delegation of ILO. Conference, Geneva.

Professional achievements 

August 2003 to date, Member of the Board of Governors of the Ghulam Ishaq Khan Institute (GIK), (Center of excellence for Science*& Technology).
1994 - Co-Chairman, Lucky Cement Ltd.
1993- President, Pakistan Badminton Association.
1964-1968- Captain Tennis Team Carnegie Mellon University USA
1973- Member Advisory Council Economic Affairs, Government of Pakistan.
1973-76- Chairman All Pakistan Flour Mills Association, Khyber-Pakhtunkhwa Zone Peshawar.
1978- Member Executive Committee, All Pakistan Lawn Tennis Association.
1978- Chairman APTMA, All Pakistan Textile Mills Association. Member Price Commission, Government of Pakistan. Vice Chairman, All Pakistan Mills Association, Karachi.
1974-76- Chairman, All Pakistan Textile Mills Association, Khyber-Pakhtunkhwa Zone Peshawar.
Life member – Lahore Press Club.

References

External links
 Inter-Provincial Co-ordination Division, Government of Pakistan

Living people
Pakistan Peoples Muslim League politicians
Year of birth missing (living people)
Salim
Carnegie Mellon University alumni
People named in the Panama Papers
Edwardes College alumni
Businesspeople from Khyber Pakhtunkhwa
Members of the Senate of Pakistan